Arthenac is a commune in the Charente-Maritime department in the Nouvelle-Aquitaine region of south-western France.

The inhabitants of the commune are known as Arthenacais or Arthenacaises

The commune has been awarded three flowers by the National Council of Towns and Villages in Bloom in the Competition of cities and villages in Bloom.

Geography
Arthenac is located in the south of Charente-Maritime in the former province of Saintonge some 24 km south-east of Pons, 16 km north-east of Jonzac, and immediately south-west of Archiac. Access to the commune is by the D699 road from Archiac in the north-west passing through the village and continuing south-west to Réaux. There is also the D251 road from Sainte-Lheurine in the north-west passing through south of the village to Saint-Eugène in the south-east. The D149 comes from the D700 in the north passing through the village then south to Allas-Champagne. The commune is mostly farmland with two large forests south of the village.

Neighbouring communes and villages

History
Under the Ancien Régime Arthenac was independent but was merged with Archiac in 1789. The commune regained its independent status on 13 October 1831.

Administration

List of Successive Mayors

Demography
In 2017 the commune had 345 inhabitants.

Distribution of Age Groups

The population of the town is younger than the departmental average.

Percentage Distribution of Age Groups in Arthenac and Charente-Maritime Department in 2017

Source: INSEE

Sites and monuments

The Church of Saint Martin (12th century) at Arthenac has had its central window restored. It is registered as a historical monument.

See also
Communes of the Charente-Maritime department

References

External links
 Arthenac on the National Geographic Institute website 
Arthenac on the 1750 Cassini Map

Communes of Charente-Maritime
Arrondissement of Jonzac